David Steele Bohigian is an American businessman and government official who served as the acting president of the Overseas Private Investment Corporation, the former development finance institution of the United States government. Bohigian previously served as the corporation's executive vice president. He was confirmed by the Senate by voice vote in August 2017 under the Donald Trump administration. He also served as Assistant Secretary of Commerce for Market Access and Compliance under President George W. Bush. Bohigian is also an investor, venture capitalist, and has graduated from law school.

Education
Bohigian graduated with a bachelor’s degree in journalism from Washington and Lee University in 1992 and a Juris Doctor degree from Washington University School of Law in St. Louis in 1995.

Career
After graduating, Bohigian served as a director and equity partner at venture capital firm Jefferson Partners from October 1995 to June 1999.

In 1999, Bohigian co-founded and served as a managing director at VenCatalyst, a venture capital firm focused on technology companies. In 2000, VenCatalyst was acquired by Internet business incubator Idealab. Bohigian would go on to serve as a managing director at Idealab after the acquisition. As part of Idealab, Bohigian also served in executive roles for their portfolio companies.

After his stint working for the Bush administration’s Commerce Department, Bohigian founded private equity firm E2 Capital Partners in 2009, which focused on energy efficiency projects.

In 2010, Bohigian joined Bridgewater Associates’ core management team. He served as part of Bridgewater’s staff until 2013, when he founded and became managing director of the financial advisory firm and impact investment fund Pluribus Ventures.

Bohigian is also a member of institutions such as the Council on Foreign Relations, the Eagle Scouts of America, and the Missouri Bar Association.

Government career
Bohigian began his career in government by working for Speaker of the House Newt Gingrich in 1995 as an intern and staff assistant.

In 2002, George W. Bush’s administration offered Bohigian a position in the Commerce Department. He held several positions in the Department of Commerce, including Director of Policy and Strategic Planning from 2002 to 2005 and Assistant Secretary of Commerce for Market Access and Compliance from 2005 to 2009.

In September 2008, Bohigian led a clean energy and environment trade mission to China and India as a representative of the Bush administration. Bohigian also served as the Commerce Department’s representative in the Committee on Foreign Investment in the United States (CFIUS).

In late 2016, Bohigian was appointed to the Donald Trump administration’s Commerce Department transition team. In February 2017, he served as a special adviser to the United States Department of the Treasury.

In June 2017, President Trump announced his intent to nominate Bohigian as Executive Vice President of the Overseas Private Investment Corporation (OPIC). In August 2017, he was confirmed by the Senate to his position in the OPIC. Bohigian eventually assumed the role of acting president and CEO of the OPIC in March 2019. During his time in the OPIC, Bohigian helped implement the Better Utilization of Investments Leading to Development Act (BUILD Act), pitched the Blue Dot Network infrastructure program, approved more than $6 billion in investment worldwide, and helped launch the 2X Africa initiative for women’s empowerment alongside Advisor to the President Ivanka Trump. He also helped oversee the OPIC’s conversion into the U.S. International Development Finance Corporation. In late 2019, Bohigian left his position as acting president.

In 2019, President Trump nominated Bohigian as a member of the President’s Commission on White House Fellowships. He currently serves as a Commissioner of the White House Fellows Foundation.

References 

21st-century American businesspeople
Date of birth missing (living people)
George W. Bush administration personnel
Living people
Overseas Private Investment Corporation officials
Place of birth missing (living people)
Trump administration personnel
United States Department of Commerce officials
United States Department of the Treasury officials
Year of birth missing (living people)
Washington University School of Law alumni